The sugarcane woolly aphid (Ceratovacuna lanigera) is an aphid in the superfamily Aphidoidea in the order Hemiptera. Found in India and Southeast Asia, tt is a true bug and sucks sap from plants. It is a foliage sucking aphid species.

References 

 http://animaldiversity.org/accounts/Ceratovacuna_lanigera/classification/
 http://www.nbair.res.in/Aphids/Ceratovacuna-lanigera.php
 http://www.iisc.ernet.in/~currsci/aug102004/307.pdf
 https://www.researchgate.net/publication/238093819_Bioefficacy_of_some_botanicals_against_the_sugarcane_woolly_aphid_Ceratovacuna_lanigera_Zehnter
 http://aphid.speciesfile.org/Common/basic/Taxa.aspx?TaxonNameID=1162543
 http://www.plantwise.org/KnowledgeBank/Datasheet.aspx?dsid=16271

Hormaphidinae
Agricultural pest insects
Insect pests of millets